Peterson v. City of Greenville, 373 U.S., was a United States Supreme Court case that maintained the illegality of race-based segregation in public places. Ten African American student protesters were arrested and convicted in Greenville, South Carolina for attempting to purchase food at an S.H. Kress lunch counter. After the African American students arrived at the restaurant and sat at the lunch counter, the manager abruptly closed the store and instructed the protesters to leave. The manager and police argued that the protesters violated a state trespassing ordinance and were not arrested because of their race. While the Supreme Court of South Carolina maintained the students' guilt, the United States Supreme Court reversed the decision, citing that a "violation of the Fourteenth Amendment cannot be saved by attempting to separate the mental urges of the discriminators."

Background

In the early 1960s, segregation in most public places in South Carolina was mandated by both by state law and city ordinance. A city of Greenville ordinance, 31-8, as amended in 1958 read, "It shall be unlawful for any person owning, managing or controlling any hotel, restaurant, cafe, eating house, boarding-house or similar establishment to furnish meals to white persons and colored persons in the same room, or at the same table, or at the same counter; provided." Non-violent protests against segregation in public places had intensified in Greenville in the early 1960s, including the Greenville Eight's sit-in at the city's public library and the sit-ins at local restaurants.

On August 9, 1960, fourteen African American high school students entered into a S.H. Kress Store in downtown Greenville, South Carolina. Many of the protestors were students of Sterling High School. When the protesters entered the restaurant and sat at a lunch counter designed for 59 people, the manager demanded that they leave, declaring the store closed and turning off the lights. The white patrons left the restaurant, but the African American protesters remained, refusing to leave. The manager instructed one of his employees to call the police. When the police arrived, the manager said that he asked the protesters to leave because the integration of public facilities was "contrary to local customs." The ten protesters who were over sixteen years of age were charged with trespassing; the four minors were not arrested. Each of the ten arrested were convicted and sentenced to either pay a $100 fine or serve 30 days in jail.

The store manager and the police admitted that the students were clean, well-dressed, and quiet. The manager stated that Negroes were invited to patronize all departments of S.H. Kress except for the lunch counter. The petitioners asserted that the state of South Carolina had denied them their First and Fourth Amendment rights to free speech and equal protection under the law respectively.

Appealing the decision

The initial appeal to the Greenville County court was dismissed. In the case State v. Randolph et al., 239 S.C. 79, the defense argued that their arrest and conviction was not because of a trespassing violation but rather an effect of a custom of racial segregation. The defense appealed to the South Carolina Supreme Court.

The Supreme Court of South Carolina noted that the charge made no mention of a segregation-based law, citing the language of the trespassing ordinance: "Any person...who...fails and refuses, without good cause or excuse, to leave immediately upon being ordered or requested to do so by the person in possession, or his agent or representative." The state supreme court maintained that the reason the student protesters were arrested was because they were asked to leave, but remained on the premises. The court concluded that the arrest and conviction of the ten protesters was lawful and that the judgement was affirmed.

Argument before the Supreme Court

Matthew Perry was the lead attorney for the defense, arguing a violation of the African American students' constitutional rights.

Decision

On May 20, the court decided unanimously that the arrest and conviction of the ten African American protesters was a violation of their Fourteenth Amendment rights and reversed the decision of the South Carolina Supreme Court. 

Justice John Harlan authored the majority opinion, which was delivered by Chief Justice Earl Warren. In his opinion, Harlan wrote:

See also
Adickes v. S. H. Kress & Co.
Greenville Eight
African Americans in South Carolina
South Carolina in the civil rights movement

References

Segregation
Civil Rights Movement portal
Civil rights movement
Civil rights protests in the United States
Activists from South Carolina
History of South Carolina
Politics of the Southern United States
1963 in United States case law
United States Supreme Court cases of the Warren Court
United States Supreme Court cases
Lunch counters
S. H. Kress & Co.